The Infinities is a 2009 novel by John Banville.

Plot introduction
The book involves a reunion of the Godley family as the family patriarch, Adam, lies in a coma on his deathbed. The book takes place in an alternative reality with the world powered by cold fusion and steam trains are still in use. His family, consisting of Adam his son (and Adam's wife Helen), his daughter Petra and his wife Ursula are present at this reunion. The story is narrated by the god Hermes, who dictates how the story will unfold along with his father Zeus and his mother Maia.

History
Banville intended The Infinities as a faithful adaptation of the play Amphitryon by the German playwright Heinrich von Kleist. The novel did not turn out quite like this though - "I kept the Skeleton, but fiction always goes in its own direction."

Reception
The Infinities, Banville's first novel under his own name since 2005, was well received and seen to fit naturally into his oeuvre. "In the 1980s, Banville challenged his readers to imagine a Nabokov novel based on the life of a Gödel or an Einstein," wrote Irish literary critic Val Nolan in The Sunday Business Post. "The Infinities is finally that book. Old Adam's lineage runs through Oppenheimer, Hilbert, Brahe, Kepler, and hence to Banville's so-called Revolutions Trilogy of science novels."

References

External links
 Articles and More: John Banville Author interview about The Infinities from the Irish Examiner, 5 September 2009.

2009 Irish novels
Alternate history novels
Novels by John Banville
Picador (imprint) books